Hugh Fuller (27 April 1912 – March 1965) was a Jamaican cricketer. He played in one first-class match for the Jamaican cricket team in 1949/50.

See also
 List of Jamaican representative cricketers

References

External links
 

1912 births
1965 deaths
Jamaican cricketers
Jamaica cricketers
Sportspeople from Kingston, Jamaica